Syed Shahidul Islam is a Bangladeshi musician and composer. Generally known as Shahid and for his band Doorbin. He worked in 26 mixed album and released his three solo album.

Early life

Syed Shaidul Islam was born and raised in Chittagong, where he learned music, studying the harmonium under Soumyo Didi. None of his family members liked music, so he had to practiced his singing secretly. Shahid first got recognised as a singer as a student of Al Khan High School, when he won the first prize in an inter district 'Nazrul' song competition. Afterwards he studied music at Shilpokola Academy while he was a student at Chittagong City College. He formed a band named 'Lohitto'  when he was a graduate student in Economics. Later, he moved to Dhaka. In 2004 he formed the band Doorbin with Sabbir and Noyon.

Career
Shahid is the chief vocalist of the band Doorbin. In 2008 Shahid released his first solo album Brishtir Gaan. In 2011 he released his second solo album Nilambori from which Ek Jibon was nominated for Meril Prothom Alo Awards. He released a sequel Ek Jibon 2 in 2012. The music video of the album Nilambori was scripted by Zahid Akbar and directed by Arfin Rumi. He joined the collaborative album Bappi featuring 3 in 2012. Nil Chowa, his third solo album, was released in 2013. He collaborated with Porshi for the soundtrack of the movie Na Bola Bhalobasa.

Solo album
 Bristir Gaan (2008)
 Nilambori (2011)
 Nil Chowa (2013)

References

Further reading

External links 

 

Bangladeshi composers
21st-century Bangladeshi male singers
21st-century Bangladeshi singers